Leon Byner (born 17 September 1948) is an Australian broadcaster who started his radio career in 1966 in Shepparton, Victoria, Australia. Leon has worked successfully in Sydney, Brisbane, Melbourne, Perth, and Hobart. Byner has been at 5AA for over 2 decades and currently hosts a top rating morning talk show on radio station 5AA Adelaide and 9 radio Macquarie affiliates in country SA.

Career
During his career Byner has worked on radio in every Australian state capital since. 
Byner switched from music presentation to talk radio in 1996 and has even done a couple of stints on Los Angeles talk stations in California.
Byner has also presented segments for Adelaide, Brisbane local television and satellite TV Europe on Australian and international celebrities.
He has been nominated 13 times for ACRA awards (best talk and current affairs) and Australian of the Year three times. This is because his radio programme is known for helping many people in the community.

Byner retired from 5AA on 2 December 2022.

ACMA investigation
On 25 October 2011 ACMA found that on 1 October 2010 Byner's show had breached the Commercial Radio Codes by presenting a paid advertisement to promote water purifiers as a current affairs item regarding the "dangers" of water fluoridation. FIVEaa were also found to have breached the complaint handling provisions as directed by the code. During the investigation, was also acknowledged that Byner had no private arrangement with any party connected with the interview.

External links
Leon Byner Show on FIVEaa's website
comment   

People from Adelaide
Living people
Australian talk radio hosts
1946 births
Place of birth missing (living people)